The Sergeant from Burralee is an Australian television play written by Phillip Grenville Mann. The play was also broadcast by the BBC and screened for West German television.

It was turned into a radio play in 1970. Mann then adapted it into a play Day of Glory.

Plot
In the 1830s, a white settler is speared in the Newastle district. An Aboriginal, Jacko, is charged with the crime. However Captain Alcot interrogates Jacko, becomes convinced of his innocence, and sends a despatch to Sydney saying he is going to release the man. That night a party is held in the officers' mess and, in a drunken stupor, Lt Ned Louden shoots Jacko in the back.

Urged on by Nathaniel Carlton, the resident magistrate, Captain Alcot writes to Sydney to explain the situation. Louden is arrested and brought to Sydney for a trial. Thomas Morland, the acting attorney-general, is sent to Newcastle to investigate the murder.

Captain Alcot wishes to keep on the good side of the land-hungry Carlton so they attempt to defend the drunken lieutenant who has shot a native. Neither believe the prisoner Jacko had anything to do with the murder of a white settler, since he was captured 60 miles away from the crime. So they bribe Sergeant Constantine, who arrested Jacko, into saying that the place of arrest was close to Newcastle.

At a trial in Sydney, the lieutenant is charged with murder by the Acting Attorney-General. False testimony by Constantine brings a verdict of not guilty; but the playwright makes it clear that it is as much a victory as a defeat—"people will have second thoughts" about molesting aborigines after this.

Cast
Alistair Duncan as Thomas Morland, the acting Attorney General
Deryck Barnes as Sgt Constantine
Gordon Glenwright as Captain Alcot
Candy Williams as Jacko
Stewart Ginn as Nathaniel Carlton
Fernande Gynn as Constantine's wife Bessie
Hugh Stewart as Robert McDonald
John Gray as Sgt Lane
Reg Lye as Joshua Beer
Keith Buckley as Jack Salisbury
Noanie Roathsay as Matha Sailsbury
Edward Hepple
Jon Dennis as Newton
Douglas Bladen as Sentry
Lance Bennett as Taylor
Phillip Ross as Gaoler
Max Meldrum as the lieutenant
Nigel Lovell
Moray Powell

Production
The play was based on a real life trial when a soldier was charged with the murder of an Aboriginal. It was written by Philip Grenville Mann, an Australian writer who was living in England. He got the idea for the play after reading historical records at Australia House in London; he read about the accidental shooting of an Aboriginal during the time of Governor Phillip and did further research. He wrote it originally under the title The Sergeant from Lone Pine.

The play won equal first prize in the 1959 New South Wales Journalists' Club Award out of 250 entries. (The other winner was J.V. Warner's World Without End.) President of the Journalists' Club was Kenneth Slessor and the judges, representing each of the three Sydney television stations, were Brett Porter (ATN-7), Raymond Menmuir (ABN-2) and Peter Benardos (TCN-9). Menmuir says the moment he read it, he suggested the ABC buy it. "It's a darned fine play," said Menmuir. "The scenes are short, the action moves swiftly and smoothy and it has a universality of appeal."

Mann returned to Australia in 1961 after six years in England and replaced Rex Rienits as the ABC's drama editor. He would later write the historical ABC drama series The Patriots.

It was shot live at the ABC's studios in Sydney. Alistair Duncan was an English actor who had recently settled in Australia and had played Captain Bligh's secretary in Stormy Petrel. Sets and costumes were by Geoff Wedlock. Nine sets were constructed for the play, including gaols and courtrooms.

Reception
The Sydney Morning Herald wrote  that "it is an admirable play, dealing searchingly with the impulses, compulsions and motives of a gallery of characters...The production... was quite gripping; the play itself, most notably in the courtroom scenes, showed how telling a medium TV can be... this play was one of the best the A.B.C. has done."

Val Marshall from the Sunday edition of the Herald said it "let me with that rather unsatisfactory feeling of a good piece of material well handled, but which could have been a great deal better than it was" saying that "it got first rate treatment from Raymond Menmuir" but felt 90 minutes was too long and Duncan was miscast."

1961 BBC Version
In May 1960 the BBC announced they would film the play, then known as The Sergeant of Lone Pine. The play was filmed by the BBC in 1961 as The Attorney General It was directed by Harold Clayton.

Cast
John Clements as Thomas Morland
Andre Van Gyseghem as Nathaniel Carlton
Olive McFarland as Bessie Constantine
Anthony Bate as Sergeant Lane
Norman Mitchell as Sergeant Constantine
James Sharkey as Lieutenant Ned Louden
Richard Vernon as Captain Alcot
Michael Danvers-Walker as James Newton
Leonard Cracknell as Frank Taylor
Sonny Pillay as Jacko
John Wilding as The Sentry
Ronald Adam as Robert MacDonald
Christopher Hodge as John Sanders
Robert Cawdron as Joshua Beer
Carole Ann Ford as Martha Salisbury

Reception
The Daily Telegraph called it "strong drama... an uncommonly interesting 90 minutes."

The Sunday Times called it "a solidly made, thoroughly decent piece of joinery."

Radio
It was also adapted for radio.

Day of Glory
Mann adapted the story into a play Day of Glory which had its debut in 1964 at the Old Tote in Sydney.

The play was revived in 1970 in Melbourne.

The Age called it "a play of good ideas treated with good stagecraft."

See also
List of television plays broadcast on Australian Broadcasting Corporation (1960s)

References

External links
The Sergeant from Burralee at AustLit
The Sergeant from Burralee at National Film and Sound Archive

1960s Australian television plays
1962 television plays
Fiction set in the 1830s